G. Krug & Son Ironworks is a historic iron works located at Baltimore, Maryland, United States. It is a complex consisting of a two-story tall gable-roofed building dating from the first quarter of the 19th century, which houses the earliest shop; a four-story tall Victorian building which houses a business office on the first floor and storage rooms on the upper floors; and a three-story tall shed-roofed addition dating from 1870 to 1880. It is in its fifth generation as a family business.

G. Krug & Son began in 1810 and is recognized as the oldest continuously operating blacksmith shop in the United States. The works is responsible for iron grills, railings, and other architectural elements that may be seen on buildings throughout Baltimore and at the Ginter House in Richmond, Virginia.

G. Krug & Son was listed on the National Register of Historic Places in 1982.

References

External links
, including photo from 2002, at Maryland Historical Trust
G. Krug & Son website

Ironworks and steel mills in Maryland
Defunct iron and steel mills
Downtown Baltimore
Museums in Baltimore
Industry museums in Maryland
Industrial buildings and structures on the National Register of Historic Places in Baltimore
Manufacturing companies established in 1810
1810 establishments in Maryland
Defunct companies based in Baltimore
Blacksmith shops
Baltimore City Landmarks